Joseph Morrow may refer to:

 Joe Morrow (born 1992), Canadian ice hockey defenceman
 Joseph Morrow (officer of arms), Lord Lyon King of Arms
 Joseph McKeen Morrow (1832–1899), American lawyer and politician